The 2009 Tashkent Challenger was a professional tennis tournament played on indoor hard courts. It was the second edition of the tournament which was part of the 2009 ATP Challenger Tour. It took place in Tashkent, Uzbekistan between 12 and 18 October 2009.

Singles main-draw entrants

Seeds

 Rankings are as of October 5, 2009.

Other entrants
The following players received wildcards into the singles main draw:
  Rifat Biktyakov
  Rohan Bopanna
  Murad Inoyatov
  Vaja Uzakov

The following players received entry from the qualifying draw:
  Arsen Asanov (as a Lucky loser)
  Andrei Gorban
  Sarvar Ikramov
  Konstantin Kravchuk
  Jiří Krkoška

Champions

Singles

 Marcos Baghdatis def.  Denis Istomin, 6–3, 1–6, 6–3

Doubles

 Murad Inoyatov /  Denis Istomin def.  Jiří Krkoška /  Lukáš Lacko, 7–6(4), 6–4

External links
Uzbekistan Tennis Federation website
ITF Search 
2009 Draws

Tashkent Challenger
Tashkent Challenger